Wilbinga is a locality within the Shire of Gingin, just beyond the Perth metropolitan area's northern limit.

Wilbinga is bounded by the City of Wanneroo to the south, Wanneroo Road and the former Gingin Stock Route to the east, Woodridge to the north and the Indian Ocean to the west. Most of the suburb's area is contained within State Forest No. 65 (South) and, apart from Wanneroo Road, the locality contains no sealed roads. Tracks from Wilbinga Road provide access to isolated Wilbinga Beach. As at the 2021 Census, Wilbinga had a population of 8.

A fire lookout at Wabling Hill, originally constructed in 1959, provides views to the Moore River to the north, the ocean to the west, and generally over the state forest and small pine plantations nearby. Wabling Hill mallee (Eucalyptus argutifolia) is endemic to the area. Many 4WD clubs use the area as access to surrounding tracks. About 1 km south of Wilbinga beach are the shacks built by sheep farmers and then rebuilt by local citizens.

References

Towns in Western Australia
Shire of Gingin